The Rasmancha (Bengali: রাসমঞ্চ; Raasmoncho) is a historical temple located at Bishnupur, Bankura district, West Bengal, India. It was commissioned by Mallabhum king Hambir Malla Dev (Bir Hambir) in 1600 CE. Length and breadth of this temple is 24.5 meter and the height is 12.5 meter. The base of the temple is made of laterite stone and upper part is made with bricks. 

Built on a laterite plinth, it is an impressive square building with a small shrine in the centre and three-corridor galleries with vaulted roofs enclosing it. The building is used for putting up idols from other temples on the occasion of Ras festival.

During the Vaishnava Ras festival, all the Radha Krishna idols of Bishnupur town used to be brought here to be worshipped by the citizens. The annual festival was held till 1932.

Footnotes

External Links 

Radha Krishna temples
Bankura district
Mallabhum temples
16th-century Hindu temples
1600 establishments
Hindu temples in Bankura district